Sheila Mae Townsend (born October 2, 1980) is a Canadian female professional basketball player.

Career
While earning her bachelor's degree in Human Kinetics, Townsend played with the University of British Columbia Thunderbirds basketball team from 2000-2005. As a co-captain in 2004, Townsend led the Thunderbirds to their first women's national basketball title.

After graduation, Townsend played professional basketball in Australia, Germany, and the Czech Republic. She also played on Canada's Women's National Team from 2004-07.

References

External links
Profile at eurobasket.com

1980 births
Living people
Canadian women's basketball players
Shooting guards
Basketball players from Vancouver
UBC Thunderbirds basketball players